Hai! (Live in Japan) is a 1982 live album by the U.K. industrial band Cabaret Voltaire. It was recorded at the Tsubaki House in Tokyo, Japan on 23 March 1982, and was released on CD in 1991 by Mute Records Ltd. The original master tapes being lost, the CD was transferred from a vinyl copy (unfortunately, a US pressing was used, with significantly poorer sound and more surface noise than a Japanese original).

The performance on the album reflected the band's move towards a more funk-oriented sound. Alan Fish had joined the band by this time on drums and percussion, replacing Chris Watson.

The album reached number five in the UK Indie Chart in 1982.

Track listing 
Side A:
 "Walls of Kyoto" - 7:50
 "3 Days Monk" - 7:03
 "Yashar" (Version) - 6:59
Side B:
 "Over & Over" - 4:53
 "Diskono" - 7:01
 "Taxi Music" (Version) - 11:41

Personnel 
Cabaret Voltaire 
 Stephen Mallinder - vocals, bass guitar
 Richard H. Kirk - guitar, clarinet, synthesizer, tapes
 Alan Fish - drums, percussion

References

Cabaret Voltaire (band) live albums
1982 live albums
Mute Records live albums